Nir Eyal (born June 1970) is a bioethicist and Henry Rutgers Professor of Bioethics and Director of the Center for Population–Level Bioethics at Rutgers University in New Jersey.  He was formerly a bioethicist in the Department of Global Health and Population of the Harvard T.H. Chan School of Public Health and the Department of Global Health and Social Medicine of the Harvard Medical School.  He has long worked closely with Harvard bioethicist Daniel Wikler.  Eyal's current visibility concerns his role in studying the ethics of human challenge trials in HIV, malaria, and coronavirus vaccine development.  He has also written on 'bystander risks' during pandemics and infectious diseases and contract tracing during ebola.

Career
Eyal received his early education at Tel Aviv University and Hebrew University in Israel and the DPhil in Politics from Oxford University. He worked with Peter Singer and others during his 2004-2006 post-doctoral study at Princeton University in the NIH Department of Clinical Bioethics and the Princeton University Center for Human Values. He researched and taught from through 2019 in the Department of Global Health and Social Medicine of the Harvard Medical School and in the Department of Global Health and Population of the Harvard T.H. Chan School of Public Health.  During those thirteen years, he was affiliated with Faculties of the Harvard Law School and Harvard Faculty of Arts and Sciences and their research centers.  In 2009–2010, he was a Faculty Fellow in a visitorship at the Edmond J. Safra Center for Ethics in Cambridge.

Since mid-2019, Eyal has been a faculty member within the Rutgers Department of Philosophy and Director of the Center for Population–Level Bioethics there.

Education and postdoctoral training
 2004–2006 Harold T Shapiro Postdoctoral Fellowship in Bioethics, Princeton University Center for Human Values
 2002–2004 Postdoctoral Fellow, National Institutes of Health, Department of Clinical Bioethics
 1998–2003 DPhil, Politics (political philosophy), Oxford University
 1994–1998 MA, Philosophy, Hebrew University 
 1991–1994 BA, Philosophy and History, Tel Aviv University

Awards
 Lady Davis Fellowship – Hebrew University of Jerusalem (2018)
 Nominated for Donald O’Hara Faculty Prize for Excellence in Teaching – Harvard Medical School (2014)
 Rector Award – Roskilde University (2013)
 Academics Stand Against Poverty (ASAP) Award – Yale University (2011)
 Mark S. Ehrenreich Prize in Healthcare Ethics Research – International Association of Bioethics and USC (2010) – For best paper in the International Association of Bioethics Congress, with coauthor Neema Sofaer.
 Young Scholar Award, Ethics and Public Life Program – Cornell University (2006)

Select publications
 Eyal N, Lipsitch M. How to Test Severe Acute Respiratory Syndrome Coronavirus 2 Vaccines Ethically Even After One Is Available, Clinical Infectious Diseases, ciab182, 26 February 2021. https://doi.org/10.1093/cid/ciab182.  Accessed May 13, 2021.
 Steel R, Buchak L, Eyal N. Why continuing uncertainties are no reason to postpone challenge trials for coronavirus vaccines. Journal of Medical Ethics. 2020. DOI 10.1136/medethics-2020-106501.
 Eyal N, Halkitis PN. AIDS Activism and Coronavirus Vaccine Challenge Trials. AIDS and Behavior, 2020.
 Eyal N, Lipsitch M, Smith PG. Human challenge studies to accelerate coronavirus vaccine licensure. J Infect Dis. 2020;221:1752.
 Eyal N. The benefit/risk ratio challenge in clinical research, and the case of HIV cure: an introduction. J Med Ethics. 2017;43:65–6.
 Eyal N. How to keep high-risk studies ethical: classifying candidate solutions. J Med Ethics. 2017;43:74–7.
 Eyal N. Why Challenge Trials of SARS‐CoV‐2 Vaccines Could Be Ethical Despite Risk of Severe Adverse Events. Ethics & Human Research. 2020.
 Eyal N, Lipsitch M, Smith PG. Human challenge studies to accelerate coronavirus vaccine licensure. 2020. The Journal of infectious diseases 221 (11), 1752–1756.
 Brown MJ, Goodwin J, Liddell K, Martin S, Palmer S, Firth P, N Eyal, ... Allocating Medical Resources in the Time of COVID-19. The New England journal of medicine 2020:382
 Eyal N, Lipsitch M. Ethical Comparators in Coronavirus Vaccine Trials.
 Eyal N, Hurst SA, Murray CJL, Wikler D, Schroeder SA. Measuring the Global Burden of Disease: Philosophical Dimensions. Oxford University Press, USA. 2020.
 Eyal N, Wikler D. Ethical complexities of responding to bystander risk in HIV prevention trials. Clinical Trials 2020:16(5), 458–460.
 Google Scholar list of publications by Nir Eyal

Personal life
Eyal is married to Leah Price, Henry Rutgers Distinguished Professor of English at Rutgers University, founder and director of the Rutgers Initiative for the Book and the author of numerous books, including What We Talk About When We Talk About Books Prior to moving to Rutgers, Price was Professor of English and American Literature at Harvard University, where at the age of 31 she became one of the youngest assistant professors ever to be promoted to tenure at Harvard. They have one son and live in Princeton, New Jersey.

Eyal is a member of Giving What We Can, a community of people who have pledged to give at least 10% of their income to effective charities.

See also
 Bat-borne virus
 Effective altruism
 Human challenge study
 Informed consent
 Risk–benefit ratio
 Zoonosis

References 

Israeli Jews
Bioethicists
Alumni of the University of Oxford
Rutgers University faculty
National Institutes of Health people
Living people
1970 births